Pterostylis roensis, commonly known as the painted rufous greenhood or dark rustyhood is a plant in the orchid family Orchidaceae and is endemic to the south-west of Western Australia. Both flowering and non-flowering plants have a relatively large rosette of leaves. Flowering plants also have up to six green or brown to blackish flowers with translucent white panels and a dark brown, fleshy, insect-like labellum.

Description
Pterostylis roensis is a terrestrial,  perennial, deciduous, herb with an underground tuber and a rosette of between six and eleven leaves. Flowering plants have a rosette at the base of the flowering stem but the leaves are usually withered by flowering time. The "head" end of the labellum has a few short hairs and there are six to nine longer bristles on each side of the "body". Flowering occurs from September to November.

Taxonomy and naming
Pterostylis roensis was first formally described in 1989 by  David Jones and Mark Clements from a specimen collected south of Norseman and the description was published in Australian Orchid Research. The specific epithet (roensis) refers to the Roe botanical district where this greenhood is common.

Distribution and habitat
The rufous greenhood grows in woodland, shrubland and in shallow soil on granite outcrops between Hyden and Balladonia in the Avon Wheatbelt, Coolgardie and Mallee biogeographic regions.

Conservation status
Pterostylis roensis is classified as "not threatened" by the Western Australian Government Department of Parks and Wildlife.

References

roensis
Endemic orchids of Australia
Orchids of Western Australia
Plants described in 1989